Mateh Binyamin Regional Council (Mo'atza Azorit Mateh Binyamin, Lit. Council for the Region of the Tribe of Benjamin) is a regional council governing 46 Israeli settlements and outposts in the West Bank. The council's jurisdiction is from the Jordan valley in the east to the Samarian foothills in the west, and from the Shiloh river in the north to the Jerusalem Mountains in the south.

The seat of the council is Psagot. The council is named for the ancient Israelite tribe of Benjamin, whose territory roughly corresponds to that of the council. The region in which the Binyamin settlements are located is referred to as the Binyamin Region.

The international community considers Israeli settlements to be illegal, but the state of Israel disputes this, and this applies to all communities under the administration of Mateh Binyamin.

In November 2007, Avi Roeh was elected head of the council. The previous head, Pinchas Wallerstein, stepped down after being in the position for 28 years.
In October 2018, Israel Gantz was elected head of the council.

Economy and employment
There are two industrial areas, Sha'ar Binyamin Industrial zone and Shiloh Industrial Zone, and a great amount of agriculture fields.

History and sites
The first capital of the Israeli kingdom was established in Shiloh, were the Tabernacle rested. The region blossomed in the Israeli kingdom, and many Jewish settlements and towns were established here. Ruins can be found today at the foundations of some of the Arab villages in the area.

List of settlements
This regional council provides various municipal services for the 46 settlements within its territory:

Ahia
Adei Ad
Almon (Anatot)
Alon
Amichai
Ateret
Beit Horon
Dolev
Eli
Esh Kodesh
Ganei Modi'in
Geva Binyamin (Adam)
Giv'at Har'el
Giv'on HaHadasha
Harasha

Hashmonaim
Keeda
Kfar Adumim
Kfar HaOranim (Menora/Giv'at Ehud)
Kokhav HaShahar
Kokhav Ya'akov
Ma'ale Levona
Ma'ale Mikhmas
Matityahu
Mevo Horon
Migron
Mitzpe Danny
Mitzpe Hagit
Mitzpe Kramim
Mitzpe Yeriho

Na'ale
Nahliel
Neria (Talmon Bet/North)
Neveh Erez
Halamish (Neve Tzuf)
Nili
Nofei Prat
Ofra
Psagot
Rimonim
Shiloh
Shvut Rachel
Talmon
Tel Zion

The majority of towns and villages are communal settlements, a small number are urban in character and two are communal. 8 communities are secular; 5 communities are mixed secular and religious (Kfar Adumim, Beit Horon, Alon, Nofei Prat, Geva Binyamin); two large neighborhoods are ultra Orthodox (Tel Zion adjacent to Kochav Yaakov, and the ultra-Orthodox neighborhood in Adam) and the rest of the communities are religious.

The community settlement of Ofarim was joined with the adjacent local council of Beit Aryeh in 2003 and has ceased to exist as an independent entity. Tel Tzion is a semiautonomous neighbourhood of Kokhav Ya'akov, though it is set to ultimately become a separate locality, while Zeit Ra'anan is a semiautonomous neighbourhood of Talmon.  Amona was dismantled by government order in 2016 and a new site was authorized in the Shiloh Bloc. Ginot Aryeh was established in 2001 but evacuated in 2004.

Settlements to be included on the Israeli side of the Israeli West Bank barrier include those in or near the Modi'in bloc (Hashmonaim, Matityahu, Na'ale, Nili), Mevo Horon in the Latrun area, Beit Horon and Giv'on HaHadasha northwest of Jerusalem, and Almon and Kfar Adumim in the Adummim area east of Jerusalem.

References

External links
Council website

 
Israeli regional councils in the West Bank